Murat Evliyaoğlu (born 2 June 1969 in Turkey) is a retired Turkish professional basketball player. He played as guard position and helped lot of times to Turkey national basketball team.

The former guard is 1.94 m.

Career
 1990-92 Çukurova Sanayi
 1992–94 Kolej Ankara
 1994–95 PTT Ankara
 1995–99 Efes Pilsen SK
 1999–00 Turk Telekom
 2000–01 Fenerbahçe
 2001–02 Turk Telekom
 2002–03 Göztepe İzmir

External links
TBLStat.net Profile

1969 births
Living people
Turkish men's basketball players
Fenerbahçe men's basketball players
Anadolu Efes S.K. players
Guards (basketball)